Li Yue (born October 27, 1993) is a Chinese canoeist. She competed at the 2016 Summer Olympics as a member of the Chinese boat in the women's K-4 500 metres race.

References

1993 births
Living people
Chinese female canoeists
Olympic canoeists of China
Canoeists at the 2016 Summer Olympics
Asian Games medalists in canoeing
Canoeists at the 2018 Asian Games
Medalists at the 2018 Asian Games
Asian Games gold medalists for China
Asian Games silver medalists for China